Yasutaka Uchiyama was the defending champion but chose not to defend his title.

Kwon Soon-woo won the title after defeating Oscar Otte 7–6(7–4), 6–3 in the final.

Seeds
All seeds receive a bye into the second round.

Draw

Finals

Top half

Section 1

Section 2

Bottom half

Section 3

Section 4

References
Main Draw
Qualifying Draw

Singles